Hasan Bekandeh (also Romanized as Ḩasan Bekandeh) is a village in Shirju Posht Rural District, Rudboneh District, Lahijan County, Gilan Province, Iran. In 2006, its population was 639, in 183 families.

References 

Populated places in Lahijan County